St. Jude Syro Malankara Catholic Church is a parish of the Syro-Malankara Catholic Eparchy of the United States of America and Canada located in Bensalem, Pennsylvania, US. St Jude celebrates  Qurbono in Malayalam and English and serves members of the Syro-Malankara Catholic Church in the Delaware Valley.

History 
The Immigration and Nationality Act of 1965 paved the way for many Indians to immigrate into the U.S. During the early 1970s, many Malankara Catholics began to migrate to the U.S. and settle in different parts of the country. Many of them chose Philadelphia as their new home town, but Malankara Liturgical Services were not available then.

A Malankara community became possible when Benedict Mar Gregorios OIC, the Archbishop of Trivandrum and the head of the Malankara Catholic Hierarchy, visited the U.S. and Canada in August 1982 and established prayer groups in major North American cities. Regular prayer meetings were held at the residences of members and Holy Masses were celebrated when Malankara priests were available.
The presence of Ignatius Thangalathil OIC, a Malankara missionary priest on special assignment in New York, helped in the formation of a Malankara Community in early 1983.
The subsequent visits of the Archbishop in 1993 and 1994 helped the community. Then the Malankara Catholic Mission of North America was inaugurated in New York in 1984.

In March 1985, Archbishop Mar Gregorios, in consultation with John Cardinal Krol, Archbishop of Philadelphia, appointed John Kalloor (now Yoohanon Mar Chrysostom) as pastor of the Malankarites in Philadelphia and Washington. The Malankara Catholic Community in Philadelphia then had regularly scheduled Malankara Liturgy celebrated at Incarnation of Our Lord Church. While organizing the community, Fr. Kalloor initiated the Malankara Catholic Youth Movement (MCYM), which became the cornerstone of building the parish.
Varghese Edathil, the successor of Fr. Kalloor, took charge of the community on March 30, 1987. He served as an associate pastor of Incarnation Church and spiritual director of the Malankara faithful. A Malankara Children’s League was inaugurated for youngsters, and religious instruction classes were initiated.

At the urging of Mar Gregorios, Cardinal Anthony Bevilacqua, Archbishop of Philadelphia, officially established the Malankara Catholic Mission of Philadelphia on May 2, 1988.
Fr. Alexander Panamkunil was the successor of Fr. Varghese and took charge as the Associate pastor of Incarnation Church and spiritual director of Malankara Catholics in October 1991.
Geevarghese Mar Timotheos, Bishop of Thiruvalla and Cyril Mar Baselious visited the community.

In April 1995, Rev. John Kalloor succeeded Fr. Alexander as the parochial vicar of Incarnation Church and spiritual director of the Malankara Catholic Mission.
Two family conferences of the Malankaraites of the Eastern regions, (New York, New Jersey, Washington and Philadelphia) were conducted at Philadelphia (1993, 1995) to discuss and evaluate issues pertaining to Malankaraite life in the U.S. The second Family conference was directed by Mar Thimotheos.

21st century
The name "St. Jude" was chosen by the Archbishop of Tiruvilla Thomas Mar Koorilos. On October 31, 2008, the current site of the parish was purchased.

St. Jude Syro Malankara Catholic Church consists of 85 families with over 300 members. Holy Qurbono, prayer meetings, and Malankara Qurbono are held in English. Sunday School classes are held before Sunday Mass.

There was a YMCL (Young Malankara Catholic League), later discontinued and merged with Sunday School, consisting of 38 youngsters between the ages of 7 and 20.

Altar servers are trained to carry on the Malankara Liturgy; they take turns in serving.

Vicars 

Indian-American culture in Pennsylvania
Christianity in Philadelphia
Eastern Catholic churches in Pennsylvania
Malayali American
Syro-Malankara Catholic Church
Churches completed in 1948